The Franki Show is a web series created and produced by Bonnie Carter and Joey Harrison. The program is a Webby Honoree and winner of the best drama award presented by the National Association of Television Program Executives at the second annual LATV Next TV Competition.

References

 The Franki Show IF Magazine http://if.com.au/2012/04/23/article/Franki-Show.../VPWQZNNJWZ.html

External links
 www.thefrankishow.com

Australian drama web series
2000s YouTube series
2010s YouTube series